Thrikkaruva  is a village in Kollam district in the state of Kerala, India. Thrikkaruva is the short form of Thiruvudal karuvaya desham(തിരുവുടൽ കരുവായ ദേശം ).The name orgin is related to the Thrikkaruva sree bhadrakali devi temple

Demographics
 India census, Thrikkaruva had a population of 24823 with 12048 males and 12775 females.

Thrikkaruva is around 10 Kilometers from Kollam City and 28 km away from Paravur town. On the far end Ashtamudi lake serves as its boundary and on the south Thrikkadavoor panchayath. Thrikkaruva is part of the new backwater tourism route designed with financial assistance from the Central Government. Main township in Thrikkaruva is Kanjavely, on the way to Prakkulam from Kollam.Trikkaruva Juma Masjid is the oldest mosque in Trikkaruva. Thrikkaruva Sri Bhadrakali Devi Temple (https://www.facebook.com/Thrikkaruva-Sree-Bhadrakaali-Devi-Temple-268295913342216/)  is a very old and famous worship place for Hindus. Another important one is Ashtamudi Sri Veerabhadra Swami temple. Both these God's are considered as siblings and protectors of the land by the villagers.

References

Villages in Kollam district